Aurélie Kaci (born 19 December 1989) is a French professional footballer who plays as a midfielder for Liga MX Femenil side Club América.

Early life
Born in Lyon and raised in Villeurbanne, Kaci began playing football with club ASCEM Villeurbanne until she joined FC Lyon in 2002.

Club career

Olympique Lyonnais
Kaci played her first official match with Olympique Lyonnais on 12 February 2006 during the team's 6-1 win against Besançon RC in the Challenge de France. She scored her first goal in the 85th minute of the match.

At the age of 16, Kaci played her first regular season match for Olympique Lyonnais on 3 September 2006, the first day of the 2006-2007 season. Her debut came during a 3-0 win against ASJ Soyaux after coming in during the 79th minute. During her first season with the team, she made six appearances.

During the next two seasons, she played in four matches in Division 1 and changed regularly with the club's reserve team in Division 3. Kaci increased her playing time with the Division 1 squad during the 2009-2010 season where she played in almost all league games. She scored her first goal against AS Saint-Étienne helping Lyon defeat the team 5-0.

Paris Saint-Germain
Out of contract with Lyon at the end of the 2011-2012 season, Kaci left Olympique Lyonnais and signed with Paris Saint-Germain for the 2012-2013 season. During the 2012-13 season, she started in 20 of the 22 matches in which she appeared and scored two goals.

Olympique Lyonnais

In 2015, Kaci returned to Lyon by signing a two-year deal with the current Division 1 champions. While playing for Lyon, she won two additional championship titles in each of the Division 1, the Coupe de France, and the UEFA Women's Champions League.  She was injured in May 2016, therefore missing that year's Division 1 finals and the Olympic games.

Atlético de Madrid

In 2017, Kaci signed to play in the Liga Feminina Iberdrola, becoming the first French player to play for Atlético de Madrid.

CD Tacón

In 2019, Kaci signed for CD Tacón in the Primera División.

International career

Kaci was selected to represent the French national team starting in 2013, making her first appearance on 25 Oct in a match against Poland.

In 2015, she was selected to be an alternate for the World Cup, but forfeited her selection due to a quadriceps injury. On 27 Oct 2015, Kaci started in her first national team game in a qualifying match for the UEFA Women's Euro 2017.

The next year, she was on the roster for the 2016 SheBelieves Cup, but did not play. A torn ligament suffered in May that year prevented her from playing in the Olympics.

Career statistics

Club
As of 1 June 2017

International

Honors

Club
 Division 1 Féminine (Champions of France): Winner 2006–07, 2007–08, 2008–09, 2009–10, 2010–11, 2011–12, 2015–16, 2016-17
 Coupe de France Féminine: Winner 2007–2008, 2011–2012, 2015–2016, 2016–17
 UEFA Women's Champions League: Winner 2010–11, 2011–12, 2015–16, 2016-17

Notes

References

External links

 PSG player profile
 Lyon player profile
 
 
 
 
 
 

1989 births
Living people
French women's footballers
France women's international footballers
French expatriate sportspeople in Spain
Expatriate women's footballers in Spain
Footballers from Lyon
Paris Saint-Germain Féminine players
Olympique Lyonnais Féminin players
Division 1 Féminine players
Primera División (women) players
Atlético Madrid Femenino players
Women's association football defenders
Women's association football midfielders
Real Madrid Femenino players